Utricularia australis is a medium-sized, perennial species of aquatic bladderwort. This species has a vast geographic range, being found throughout Europe, in tropical and temperate Asia including China and Japan in the east, Central and Southern Africa, Australia and the North Island of New Zealand. The specific epithet "australis" is Latin for "southern" and reflects the fact that the discovery of this species was made in Australia in 1810.

References

External links 

Carnivorous plants of Africa
Carnivorous plants of Asia
Carnivorous plants of Australia
Carnivorous plants of New Zealand
Flora of the North Island
australis
Lamiales of Australia
Flora of New South Wales
Flora of Victoria (Australia)
Flora of Tasmania
Eudicots of Western Australia
Flora of South Australia
Flora of the Northern Territory
Plants described in 1810